Yohannes II (Ge'ez: ዳግማዊ ዮሐንስ; 1699 – 18 October 1769) was Emperor of Ethiopia, and a member of the Solomonic dynasty. He was the son of Iyasu I, and brother of Emperors Tekle Haymanot I, Dawit III, and Bakaffa.

Reign
According to James Bruce, during the reign of his brother Bakaffa (1721-1730), the Emperor had vanished from view and a rumor circulated that Bakaffa had died. Qegnazmach Giyorgis acted on this by bringing Yohannes down from the royal prison on Wehni to rule, but before Yohannes could be proclaimed emperor, Bakaffa revealed himself and ordered the two men punished for their presumption, Giyorgis with death and Yohannes by having his hand cut off. However, in his edition of Bruce's work Alexander Murray replaced Bruce's words with a summary of the Royal Chronicle, which records Yohannes had lost his hand for escaping from Wehni prior to this event, and instead, along with the other royal prisoners of Wehni, had refused to descend and be made Emperor. In either case, Yohannes did not become emperor during the 1720s or 1730s.

Then, later, following the murder of Iyoas I in 1769, Ras Mikael Sehul summoned the late Emperor's great-uncle, Yohannes, from Wehni, although Yohannes must then have been in his seventies at least,  and presented him to the royal council as his choice for Emperor. When one of the council pointed out that Yohannes lacked one of his hands (it had been cut off in punishment for attempting to escape from Wehni), Mikael replied that if Yohannes needed help mounting his horse, he himself would help Yohannes.

Mikael married Yohannes to Mikael's own young granddaughter, Waletta Selassie.

Yohannes' reign is succinctly recounted by E. A. Wallis Budge:

John hated all military matters, and refused to march with the army, and after hiding himself begged Michael to send him back to Wahni. Michael was bound to march with his troops, but seeing it would be fatal for his plans to leave a king like John in Gondar, he had him poisoned one morning at breakfast time.

Notes

Further reading
 Shiferaw Bekele, "Yohannes II (r. May 10, 1769 - October 15, 1769)", Aethiopica, 5 (2002), pp. 89-111

1699 births
1769 deaths
18th-century emperors of Ethiopia
18th-century monarchs in Africa
18th-century murdered monarchs
Solomonic dynasty
People murdered in Ethiopia
Deaths from food poisoning
1769 murders in Africa